Dinesh Dhobi (born 15 February 1999) is an Indian cricketer. He made his List A debut on 25 February 2021, for Sikkim in the 2020–21 Vijay Hazare Trophy.

References

External links
 

1999 births
Living people
Indian cricketers
Sikkim cricketers
Place of birth missing (living people)